Teodoro Trivulzio (1458–1531) was an Italian condottiero and marshal of France.

He was born in Milan, the nephew of Gian Giacomo Trivulzio. He took part in the Italian Wars under the French King Louis XII, fighting in the French vanguard at the battle of Agnadello (1509) and in the battle of Ravenna (1512). He assisted Marshal Odet de Foix in the siege of Parma in 1521, and was named governor of Milan in 1525. Trivulzio had however to leave the latter position after the battle of Pavia in the same year, which marked the French collapse in northern Italy.

In 1526 he was created marshal of France by King Francis I, receiving the position of Governor of Genoa. He proved however unable to control the latter, and had to surrender to a revolt in 1528. In 1530 he was named governor of Lyon, where he died in 1531.

1458 births
House of Trivulzio
1531 deaths
Military personnel from Milan
15th-century condottieri
Marshals of France
16th-century condottieri